Ingolf "Skruen" Pedersen (7 December 1890 – 2 January 1964) was a Norwegian football goalkeeper. He was born in Skien. He played for the club Odd, and also for the Norwegian national team. He competed at the 1912 Summer Olympics in Stockholm. He was Norwegian champion with Odd in 1913, 1915, 1919, 1922 and 1924.

References

1890 births
1964 deaths
Sportspeople from Skien
Norwegian footballers
Norway international footballers
Odds BK players
Footballers at the 1912 Summer Olympics
Olympic footballers of Norway
Association football goalkeepers
20th-century Norwegian people